Egon Beyn (2 December 1904 – 18 November 1963) was a sailor from Germany, who represented his country at the 1928 Summer Olympics in Amsterdam, Netherlands.

References

External links
 
 
 

Year of birth uncertain
1963 deaths
German male sailors (sport)
Olympic sailors of Germany
Sailors at the 1928 Summer Olympics – 12' Dinghy